The 2012 ANZ Championship season was the fifth season of the ANZ Championship. The 2012 season began on 31 March and concluded on 22 July. With a team coached by Noeline Taurua, captained by Laura Langman and featuring Leana de Bruin, Irene van Dyk, Julianna Naoupu and Casey Williams, Waikato Bay of Plenty Magic eventually won the premiership. They became fifth team in as many seasons to win the title. Melbourne Vixens won the minor premiership after winning 10 of their 13 matches. Meanwhile, Magic lost their first four matches.  However, they subsequently won 12 matches in a row to finish third during the regular season and champions overall. In the minor semi-final they defeated Adelaide Thunderbirds and in the preliminary final they defeated Northern Mystics after extra time. In the grand final they defeated Vixens 41–38. As a result, they became the first, and only, New Zealand team to win the Championship. They were also the first and only team to start the season with four defeats and win the title and the first and only team to finish third in the regular season and win the title.

Transfers

Head coaches

Tauranga Pre-Season Tournament
On 2, 3 and 4 March, Waikato Bay of Plenty Magic hosted a pre-season tournament at the TECT Arena in Tauranga. For the first time since 2008, all ten ANZ Championship teams competed at the same tournament. The ten teams were divided into two pools of five. Teams within each pool played each other once and the winners qualified for the final. The other teams also played in a series of playoffs to decide final placings. The tournament was won by Queensland Firebirds who defeated Melbourne Vixens 50–30 in the final.

9th/10th place playoff 
 
7th/8th place play-off
 
5th/6th place play-off
 
3rd/4th place play-off

Final

regular season 
Melbourne Vixens finished the regular season as minor premiers. After winning their first six matches, they lost to New South Wales Swifts in Round 7. They then lost three successive matches, another to Swifts and one to Northern Mystics. On 20 May in Round 8, against Mystics, Vixens were undone by Mystics defender Anna Harrison and her Harrison Hoist. Harrison made several vital blocks while being hoisted rugby union lineout-style by her defensive partners, helping Mystics secure a 49–45 win. However, Vixens successively claimed the minor premiership with three wins in the final three rounds.

Round 1

Round 2

Round 3

Round 4

Round 5

Round 6: Rivalry Round
Round 6 featured five Australia verses New Zealand matches. Goals scored by Australian and New Zealand teams were added together and the country with the most goals won the Rivalry Round Trophy.

Round 7

Round 8

Round 9

Round 10

Round 11

Round 12

Round 13

Round 14

Final table

Finals

Major semi-final

Minor semi-final

Preliminary final

Grand final

Season statistics

Award winners

ANZ Championship awards

Notes
  Temepara George and Laura Langman shared the MVP Award

All Star Team

Australian Netball Awards

Media coverage
A cumulative television audience of over 10.6 million across Australia and New Zealand watched the 2012 ANZ Championship on Network 10 and Sky Sport (New Zealand), representing a 45% increase on 2011 (7.2million).

References

 
2012
2012 in New Zealand netball
2012 in Australian netball